Khüiten Peak ("cold peak"), also known in China as Friendship Peak, is the highest peak with 4,356 m above sea level and a permanent snow cap in the Altai Range, the international border between China and Mongolia runs across its summit point. It is also the highest point of Mongolia and Altay Prefecture in Western China.

In the past, Khüiten Peak was officially known in Mongolia as the "Friendship Peak".

Khüiten Peak is one of five peaks of Tavan Bogd. Another peak, which is about 2.5 km north of it, marks the border tripoint between Russia, Mongolia, and China; the name of that peak is given in international agreements and on maps as Tavan Bogd Peak, or Mount Kuitun.

Some sources, however, associate the name Nairamdal Peak (Friendship Peak) with the peak at the border tripoint.

The first known ascent of Khüiten Peak was in 1963 by Mongolian mountaineers sponsored by the government.

See also 
 List of Altai mountains
 List of Ultras of Central Asia
 List of mountains in Mongolia
 List of mountains in China
 Nairamdal Peak (Friendship Peak)
 Malchin Peak

Sources 
 Peaklist.org: China II, Sinkiang - Xinjiang

Bibliography

References 

Altai Mountains
Mountains of Xinjiang
Mountains of Mongolia
China–Mongolia border
International mountains of Asia
Highest points of countries
Four-thousanders of the Altai